A home equity line of credit, or HELOC (/ˈhiːˌlɒk/ HEE-lok), is a revolving type of secured loan in which the lender agrees to lend a maximum amount within an agreed period (called a term), where the collateral is the borrower's property (akin to a second mortgage). Because a home often is a consumer's most valuable asset, many homeowners use their HELOC for major purchases or projects, such as home improvements, education, property investment or medical bills, and choose not to use them for day-to-day expenses.

A reason for the popularity of HELOCs is their flexibility, both in terms of borrowing and repaying. Furthermore, their popularity may also stem from having a better image than a "second mortgage", a term which can more directly imply an undesirable level of debt. However, within the lending industry itself, HELOCs are categorized as a second mortgage. HELOCs are usually offered at attractive interest rates. This is because they are secured against a borrower’s home and thus seen as low-risk financial products.

However, because the collateral of a HELOC is the home, failure to repay the loan or meet loan requirements may result in foreclosure. As a result, lenders generally require that the borrower maintain a certain level of equity in the home as a condition of providing a home equity line, usually a minimum of 15-20%.

Differences from conventional loans
A HELOC differs from a conventional home equity loan in that the borrower is not advanced the entire sum up front, but uses a line of credit to borrow sums that total no more than the credit limit, similar to a credit card. 

The term of a HELOC is split in two distinct periods. During the “draw period”, the customer can use their HELOC like a revolving facility. Draw periods typically last 10 years. During this time, the borrower can drawdown funds, repay and redraw again as many times as they wish, only paying interest on their outstanding balance. The draw period is followed by the “repayment period” where the outstanding balance plus interest is due, either as a lump-sum balloon payment or according to a loan amortization schedule.

Early repayment can usually be made at any time in the term and are either capital and interest or interest only (“minimum payment”). Repayment amount can range from the minimum payment to the full drawn amount plus interest. Lenders determine the amount they can lend to a borrower based on two variables: 1) the value of the security property and 2) the borrower’s creditworthiness. This is expressed in a combined loan-to-value (CLTV) ratio.

History of HELOCs

United States 
HELOCs became very popular in the United States in the early 2000s, in part because banks were using ad campaigns to encourage customers to take out home loans, and because interest paid was typically deductible under federal and many state income tax laws. This effectively reduced the cost of borrowing funds and offered an attractive tax incentive over traditional methods of borrowing such as credit cards. Whereas most mortgages are offered at fixed rates, HELOCs are usually offered at variable rates due to the flexibility embedded into a 10-year draw period where interest rates may change.

HELOC abuse is often cited as one cause of the subprime mortgage crisis in the United States. In 2008 major home equity lenders including Bank of America, Countrywide Financial, Citigroup, JP Morgan Chase, National City Mortgage, Washington Mutual and Wells Fargo began informing borrowers that their home equity lines of credit had been frozen, reduced, suspended, rescinded or restricted in some other manner. Falling housing prices have led to borrowers possessing reduced equity, which was perceived as an increased risk of foreclosure in the eyes of lenders.

After Tax Cuts and Jobs Act of 2017, interest on a HELOC is no longer deductible unless the loan is used for substantial home improvement. After announcing they were no longer considering applications for HELOCs in 2020, JPMorgan Chase announced in May 2022 they were reconsidering it.

Canada 
Similarly to the US, the HELOC market in Canada grew by 20% a year in the early 2000s, representing $35 billion in 2000 to approximately $186 billion in 20120. Looking at non-mortgage consumer debt, the share of HELOCs grew from 10% to 40% in that time. To put this breakthrough into perspective, credit cards consistently represented around 15% of the market share through this period. The main drivers for this evolving market where low-interest rates and sustained rising property prices. Both conditions were favourable to customers as the growing equity in their properties represented an excellent opportunity to secure larger and longer loans.

In the aftermath of the 2008 crisis, demand for HELOCs stabilized and grew by an average of 2% yearly. This slower growth could be attributed to a lower demand, exceptionally low rates on mortgages and a more regulated market. Indeed, the recession has pushed the Canadian government to take measures aimed at mitigating the risks associated with taking a HELOC. Some of these measures may have impacted the growth of the HELOC market, limiting the demand on the customer side and making lending criteria tighter. 

A 2011 decision to make HELOCs ineligible for government-backed “portfolio insurance” was one of them. This insurance was used by lenders to “securitize pooled mortgages through the National Housing Act Mortgage-Backed Securities (NHA MBS) program”. Another measure was the Office of the Superintendent of Financial Institutions (OSFI) decision to cap the maximum LTV ratio for HELOCs at 65%, thus limiting the amounts homeowners could leverage from their property. Underwriting rules were also made stricter through the Residential Mortgage Underwriting Practices and Procedures Guideline.

United Kingdom 
Despite the proliferation of HELOC products in the US and Canada, the UK market did not have a similar product offering pre-2021. This is significant as the UK market has historically replicated innovative financial products developed in the US such as credit cards or online payments. This can be partly attributed to the fact that the UK banking system is highly consolidated with little product innovation among the major lenders. This changed in the post-pandemic context where innovation in the financial services industry has accelerated, with ‘fintechs’ introducing new products to the market.

The first UK HELOC product was in 2021, by the fintech Selina Finance. As of 2022, despite less than 5% per capita utilisation of HELOC products compared to mature, established markets such as the US and Canada, UK customers have shown increasing tendency to use HELOC products as a substitute to existing consumer finance tools. As a result, annual HELOC originations have increased fivefold, from $50m in 2021 to $250m in 2022.

References

External links
Federal Reserve site offering information on HELOC loans

Mortgage
Credit
Loans